Rose Bud is a town in White County, Arkansas, in the United States. Rose Bud has a population of 482 according to a census taken in 2010. Rose Bud even with its small population is the third largest town in White County by area behind Beebe and Searcy. The demographics for the area are a majority Caucasian, then Hispanic being the second largest, followed by African-American, and Asian. A majority of the population by a small margin is between the age of 45 and 64. Rose Bud also has their own school district with Pre-K through 12th grade. Rose Buds most notable person was a retired Vietnam veteran known for attaining the Medal of Honor. Along with the Infamous haunted Darden-Gifford home within the small town.

Geography 

According to the United States Census Bureau, the town has a total area of 15.2 km (5.9 mi2), of which 15.2 km (5.9 mi2) is land and 0.17% is water.

Rose Bud is the third largest town in the county by area. Composed of mainly wooded area and cattle land.

Demographics

As of the 2010 census, the population was 482. The population density was 28.2/km (73.1/mi2). There were 191 housing units at an average density of 12.3/km (31.9/mi2). The population 89.7% White, 1.1% Hispanic, 0.8% Other, and 9.5% Two or More. There are about 105 boys for every 100 girls. Most of the population is between 50 and 54 years of age.

There were 191 households, out of which 12.9% had children under the age of 18 living with them, 29.5% were married couples living together, 4.1% had a female householder with no husband present, and 23.7% were non-families. 7.9% of all households were made up of individuals, and 7.9% had someone living alone who was 65 years of age or older.  The average household size was 2.52 and the average family size was 3.02.

In the town, the population was spread out, with 22.6% under the age of 18, 17% from 18 to 24, 22.2% from 25 to 44, 28.4% from 45 to 64, and 16% who were 65 years of age or older.  The median age was 41 years. For every 100 females, there were 105 males.  

The median income for a household in the town was $34,732, and the median income for a family was $37,375. Males had a median income of $28,438 versus $27,750 for females. The per capita income for the town was $22,677.  About 11.0% of families and 11.1% of the population were below the poverty line, including 23.3% of those under age 18 and 4.0% of those age 65 or over.

Notable Establishments 
Rose Bud's most notable establishments are RoZark Hills Roasterie, Sherwood Tractor, Rambler Grill, Caldwell Milling Co, and Pallone Veterinary Hospital.

Education 

Public education from pre-kindergarten through grade 12 is provided by the Rose Bud School District, including Rose Bud High School and Rose Bud Elementary School.

Notable person
Nick Bacon is the most noted person that has been a Rose Bud resident. He was a recipient of the esteemed Medal of Honor for his heroic actions in Vietnam in 1969. Nick was also the director of the Arkansas Department of Veterans Affairs for over a decade. Nick or Nicky bacon was born November 25, 1945 in Caraway, Arkansas. Him and his family then moved to Arizona, where Nick volunteered to join the war at 17 by forging his mother signature and 1963. His first deployment was in 1966 and ended in 1977, and then was sent to Hawaii to train new recruits. He was then not required to return to service but went back anyway to be a squad leader with the men he trained. Where he then again survived the war and finally retired in Rose Bud, Arkansas, where he died at the age of 64, on July 17, 2010.

Darden-Gifford House 
This supposedly haunted house was built in the late 1800s by J.W. Darden. After he died in 1903 his wife lived there for another five years before she sold it. Later in 1976 it was added to the National Historic Register. It was then sold to Nick Stark, who for a time leased it to the woman that spotted these strange events, Priscilla Stone. After living there for a while Mrs. Stone would hear and see strange events. Including doors slamming, curtains fall, footsteps are heard on empty stairways, and floors creak in the former servants’ quarters, which can be reached only by a narrow, hidden stairway. Many more strange occasions happened in this house when studied by paranormal investigators.

References

Towns in White County, Arkansas
Towns in Arkansas